Dichomeris crepitatrix is a moth in the family Gelechiidae. It was described by Edward Meyrick in 1913. It is found in southern India.

The forewings are ochreous brown, with scattered dark fuscous scales and a blackish streak irregularly interrupted and spotted with ground colour extending along the costa from the base to three-fourths. The stigmata are undefined, fuscous, with the discal approximated, the plical rather before the first discal. A streak of blackish irroration (sprinkles) runs along the termen, suffused with grey anteriorly. The hindwings are iridescent grey.

References

Moths described in 1913
atriguttata